CNTC may refer to:

China Tobacco, the state tobacco monopoly in China
National Confederation of Central African Workers